al-Hajj Mahmadu Lamine (died 9 December 1887) was a nineteenth-century Senegalese Tijani marabout who led an unsuccessful rebellion against the French colonial government.

Early life, education, and hajj

Lamine, also known as al-Hajj Muḥammad al-Amīn, was born between 1830 and 1840 at Goundiorou, near Kayes in what is now Mali. Educated in the Qur'an first by his father, a cleric, Lamine studied as well at Tabajang and Bunumbu before later study under Fodé-Mohammed-Saloum at Bakel. He traveled to Ségou, probably after 1850, where he met Umar Tall and may have served him. Some time between 1864 and 1874, Lamine went on a hajj, likely leaving Ségou a while after the death of Umar Tall and returning between 1878 and 1880.

Uprising

Lamine traveled to Upper Senegal and began gathering followers using the prestige gained from his hajj and subsequent role in the Toucouleur jihad. In February 1886, Lamine led his forces in armed rebellion against the French. By the end of the month, they had taken Bundu and Guoy, and vastly outnumbered the local French garrison at Medina Fort.

When French reinforcements to Kayes were delayed, Lamine began a siege of Fort Bakel.  However, the siege was soon broken, and Lamine's forces retreated toward the Gambian border, attacking villages in their path.  Lt. Col. Joseph Galliéni, the new French military commander for the region, sent more forces in pursuit.  On Christmas Day, 1886, the French entered Lamine's capital at Diana, though Lamine himself escaped.

Following this defeat, Lamine took several months to regroup, launching his next attack at the Ouli province in July 1887. Galliéni again sent his troops in pursuit, seizing Lamine's stronghold at Toubakouta on 8 December 1887. This time, Lamine was captured, and was executed by French forces on the following day. His skull currently resides in the Musée de l’Homme.

References

External links
Notes on The Conquest of the Western Sudan

1887 deaths
People of French West Africa
Senegalese Muslims
Senegalese religious leaders
Year of birth missing
Tijaniyyah order